Helm Place may refer to:

Helm Place (Elizabethtown, Kentucky), listed on the National Register of Historic Places in Hardin County, Kentucky
Helm Place (Lexington, Kentucky), listed on the National Register of Historic Places in Fayette County, Kentucky